Benita Koch-Otte (23 May 189226 April 1976), born Benita Otte, was a German weaver and textile designer who trained at the Bauhaus.

Life and work
Benita Otte was born on 23 May 1892 in Stuttgart, Germany. Otte's father was a chemist.

After attending Lyceum in Krefeld, Otte taught drawing and physical education in Uerdingen. In 1920, she enrolled at the Bauhaus in Weimar where she studied in the studio's weaving workshop. She was later employed in the workshop, working closely with Gunta Stölzl. Otte left the Bauhaus in 1925.

Although she worked primarily as a weaver, Otte, on a number of occasions, produced work beyond the medium. Notable among this work is Otte's design for the kitchen of the 1923 Haus am Horn in Weimar, which inspired Margarete Schütte-Lihotzky's 1926 Frankfurt kitchen. 

After leaving the Bauhaus, Otte served as head of the weaving workshop at the Kunstgewerbeschule Burg Giebichenstein, a vocational arts college in Halle, now the Burg Giebichenstein University of Art and Design.  In 1929 she reunited with the Czech photographer  (1896–1934) who studied with Otte at the Bauhaus; Benita married Koch later that year.

A number of former students and teachers from the Bauhaus went to work at the school, including: Gerhard Marcks, the Rector from 1928 until 1933; Hans Wittwer, who ran the Architecture department; Marguerite Friedländer and Erich Consemüller. Following the Nazi rise to power in 1933, Koch-Otte and other staff considered avant-garde were dismissed from the school.

Koch-Otte and her husband then moved to Prague. Heinrich Koch died in an accident in 1934, and Benita returned to Germany, where she taught at the Bodelschwingh Foundation Bethel (German:Bodelschwinghsche Stiftungen Bethel), a psychiatric hospital in the Bethel district of Bielefeld. At the hospital, Koch-Otte ran weaving workshop for patients. She worked at the foundation until her 1957 retirement.

Death and legacy 
Koch-Otte died on 26 April 1976 in Bielefeld, Germany.

Former students of Benita Koch-Otte include Trude Guermonprez, among others.

Benita Koch-Otte Street (Benita-Otte-Straße) in Erfurt, Germany is named after her.

See also
Women of the Bauhaus

References

External links
Bauhaus100. Benita Koch-Otte

Bauhaus alumni
German textile artists
Women textile artists
Artists from Stuttgart
20th-century German artists
20th-century German women artists
1892 births
1976 deaths